London Buses route 157 is a Transport for London contracted bus route in London, England. Running between Crystal Palace and Morden station, it is operated by Arriva London.

History

Route 157 commenced operating on 13 September 1926 as a daily service between Morden station and Wallington (Melbourne Hotel) via Morden Road, Bishopsford Road, Sutton and Carshalton. It was one of five new London Underground feeder routes (155, 156, 157, 164 and 165) that were introduced to connect to the new Northern line station at Morden, which also opened on 13 September 1926. In 1959, it was extended from Wallington to Crystal Palace via Croydon, replacing trolleybus route 654.

From January 1973 until November 1985 it was operated by Thornton Heath garage, It was operated by Croydon from August 1987 until November 1988, when operation of the route moved to London General's Sutton garage.

Upon being re-tendered, route 157 passed to Connex's Beddington Cross garage on 1 December 2001 with Alexander ALX400 bodied Dennis Trident 2s. It was included in the sale of the business to Travel London in February 2004

Upon being re-tendered, it was retained by Travel London with a new contract commencing on 2 December 2006. Route 157 was included in the May 2009 sale of Travel London to Abellio London. On 3 December 2016, Arriva London commenced operating the route after winning the tender with 18 existing Alexander Dennis Enviro400 double deckers. The route is currently based at Norwood garage, however, drivers are allocated to Thornton Heath garage. This was due to Thornton Heath not having enough capacity available following  route 64 moving there in August 2016.
On 2 December 2023 This Route will pass back to London General operating from Merton Garage (AL) with new Electric Double Deckers introduced at this same time PVR will decrease to 17.

Current route

Route 157 operates via these primary locations:
Crystal Palace bus station 
Anerley Hill for Crystal Palace station  
Anerley station  
High Street for Norwood Junction station  
Selhurst station 
West Croydon station   
Church Street tram stop 
Reeves Corner tram stop 
Wallington station 
Carshalton station 
St Helier 
Morden station

References

External links

Bus routes in London
Transport in the London Borough of Bromley
Transport in the London Borough of Croydon
Transport in the London Borough of Merton
Transport in the London Borough of Sutton